Nde Ndifonka (born ), popularly known by his stage name Wax Dey, is a Cameroonian singer, songwriter, entrepreneur and social activist. He won Best Male Artist in Central Africa at the 2016 All Africa Music Awards (AFRIMA). He owns a record label called Calabash Music. In December 2015, he released the Yemi Alade-assisted "Saka Makossa" (Dance Makossa) and pays tribute to the Makossa music genre. Wax Dey is also the Producer and main actor of Cameroonian reality TV contest, Number One Girl, which airs on Equinox TV.

In December 2020, Wax Dey was knighted with a presidential medal as Chevalier of the Order of Valour of Cameroon.

Early life  
Ndifonka was born in Bamenda and is from the Northwest Region of Cameroon. He was inspired to get into music when his father brought home a VHS cassette. He started listening to Marvin Gaye, Smokey Robinson and others. He studied at Sacred Heart College in Bamenda where he was singing with the school choir and took part in songs competitions, all this helped him find a place in music. He later graduated from the University of Buea after studying law.

Career 
He began his professional career in 2008 with the release of African Soul with records such as "Butterfly". In 2006 Richard Nwamba described him as a newfound young talent to walk in the shoes of Richard Buna He released his debut solo album in 2016 360 degrees featuring artists such as Banky W and Yemi Alade. In 2012, he earned 3 nomination for the Cameroon Entertainment Award as best artist and when speaking with Sheer publishing he said
 
He became a LuquLuqu Ambassador to the UN in Africa 2017.

In June 2020, Nde Ndifonka released the EP, Rise Again: The Lockdown EP, inspired by the COVID-19 pandemic lockdowns.

In December 2020, he ran for the position for board chair of Cameroon Music Corporation (SONACAM) and lost the elections.

Selected discography 
Rise Again: The Lockdown EP (June 2020)
Final Light (Album) - 2019
360 Degrees (album) - 2016
African Dream - 2010
African soul - 2008

Singles
 Mr Arrogant - 2019
 My Heart ft Master KG - 2019
 "I Don See My Wife" (2013) (with Dontom)
 Saka Makossa ft Yemi Alade - 2016
 "Number One Girl"
 "Kiss of the Death"
 Will you be my wifey - 2013
 I don see my wife ft Dontom - 2012

Awards and recognition

See also 

List of Cameroonians
List of African musicians

References 

1985 births
Living people
21st-century Cameroonian male singers
People from Bamenda